Walnut Grove R-V School District is a school district headquartered in Walnut Grove, Missouri. It has an elementary school and a high school.

In October 2019 the district had 279 students in grades preschool through 12.

History
In August 2019 54% of the voters rejected a tax levy meant to improve the school facility.
In October 2019 the district made an attempt at passing a tax levy. 54% of the voters rejected this in November of that year.

In 2021 a vote to increase the tax levy failed on a 189-188 basis, which meant it failed by a single vote. A recount was scheduled for April 9.

References

External links
 Walnut Grove R-V School District
Education in Greene County, Missouri
School districts in Missouri